Kama Ginkas (born 7 May 1941 in Kaunas, Lithuanian SSR, USSR) is a Russian and Soviet theatre director.

Born to a Jewish family, Ginkas was a student of Georgy Tovstonogov, Ginkas has collaborated with most major theatres in Moscow and St. Petersburg, including the Moscow Art Theatre (The Train Car and The Toastmaster), the Moscow New Generation Theatre (МТЮЗ) (We Play Crime - based on Dostoyevsky's Crime and Punishment, The Execution of the Decembrists, Anton Chekhov's The Black Monk and Lady with a Lapdog, and Rothschild's Fiddle.) His productions have traveled to festivals in Germany, Italy, Belgium, Sweden, Finland, Bosnia, Brazil, United States, Poland, Croatia, the Netherlands, the former Yugoslavia, and France. His adaptations of Chekhov's stories are visually stunning and unique in form, and have earned him the highest honors in Russia and at festivals throughout the world.  In the summer of 2003, he made his American debut with his "K.I. from Crime" at the Bard SummerScape Festival.  His English-language adaptation of the award-winning Lady with a Lapdog marked his American English-language premiere at the American Repertory Theater in Cambridge, Massachusetts. Over the past ten years Ginkas has directed a number of productions in Europe, including The Idiot in Germany and Macbeth in Finland. He has taught in the Swedish Theatre Academy in Helsinki and teaches directing at the Moscow Art Theatre School. His wife Genrietta Yanovskaya also famous theatre director - Director of Moscow TUZ (Teatr Unogo Zritelya - New Generation Theater).

External links
 The Moscow New Generation Theater
 Provoking Theater by Kama Ginkas and John Freedman
 Lady with a Lapdog American Repertory Theatre

References

1941 births
Living people
People from Kaunas
Lithuanian Jews
Soviet theatre directors
People's Artists of Russia
State Prize of the Russian Federation laureates
Russian theatre directors